Victor Contoski (born 1936, Minneapolis, Minnesota) is an American writer and university professor of Polish descent, best known for his science-fiction chess story Von Goom's Gambit, published in The Magazine of Fantasy and Science Fiction, December 1966. He got his Ph.D. in American Literature from the University of Wisconsin–Madison in 1969. In 1980 he edited a book of poetry by poets of Polish ancestry, Blood of Their Blood.<ref>Victor Contoski, Blood of Their Blood: An Anthology of Polish-American Poetry, New Rivers Press, 1980, ASIN: B00420WB8I</ref> He has published multiple volumes of poetry and taught creative writing and American Literature at the University of Kansas. In 2000, he was recipient of the HOPE Teaching Award, chosen by students. He is retired and resides in Lawrence, Kansas.

Bibliography

 Von Goom's Gambit, Chess Review, April 1966, reprinted in The Magazine of Fantasy and Science Fiction, December 1966.
 Four Contemporary Polish Poets (translations), Quixote, 1967
 Astronomers, Madonnas, and Prophecies (poetry), Juniper, 1972
 Broken Treaties (poetry), New Rivers, 1973
 Planting Beeches (translations of Harasymoxicz), New Rivers, 1975
 Names (poetry), New Rivers, 1979
 Unease (translations of Rozewicz), New Rivers, 1980
 A Kansas Sequence (poetry), Tellus, 1983
 Midwestern Buildings'' (poetry), Cottonwood, 1997

References

 http://www.kuonlinedirectory.org/endacott/data/OralHistoryTranscripts/Victor%20Contoski.pdf

1936 births
Living people
Writers from Minneapolis
People from Lawrence, Kansas
University of Wisconsin–Madison alumni